Blue Oak (Quercus douglasii) is a species of oak native to California.

Blue Oak may also refer to:
Blue Oak School, a private elementary school in Napa, California
Blue Oak Ranch Reserve, part of the University of California Natural Reserve System
Blue Oak Energy, a photovoltaic energy company
Blue Oak, a character from Pokémon